Newtown, Eliogarty may refer to one of two townlands in the Barony of Eliogarty in County Tipperary, Ireland:

Newtown, Holycross
Newtown, Ballymurreen